Sipesville is an unincorporated community in Somerset County, Pennsylvania, United States. Sipesville is named for Michael Sipe, who opened a mercantile in 1843. Sipesville has a post office, with ZIP code 15561, which opened on April 9, 1851; Levi Hoffman was the first postmaster.

References

Unincorporated communities in Somerset County, Pennsylvania
Unincorporated communities in Pennsylvania